Salem Pond Park is a public, urban park in Apex, North Carolina. Located at 6112 Old Jenks Rd, it is on the north side of Apex near Salem Elementary School.

The park consists of a train themed playground adjacent to a gated soccer pitch. The pitch has lighting for night use, and the park overlooks 2 ponds of water. There is a half-mile walking trail encompassing the park. The park is commonly used as a meeting place for students from surrounding schools.

References

Apex, North Carolina
Urban public parks
Parks in Wake County, North Carolina
Tourist attractions in Apex, North Carolina